Majak can refer to

 Mayak (disambiguation)
 Achok Majak, American model
 Majak Daw, an Australian rules footballer playing for the North Melbourne Football Club in the Australian Football League (AFL)
 Mij, Fars, also called Majak, a small town in Iran